{{DISPLAYTITLE:C3H6Cl2}}
The molecular formula C3H6Cl2 (molar mass: 112.98 g/mol, exact mass: 111.9847 u) may refer to:

 1,2-Dichloropropane
 1,3-Dichloropropane